Transport and Logistics Bureau is one of the fifteen policy bureaux for the Hong Kong Special Administrative Region Government. It is responsible for the transport and logistics policy portfolios. The agency was established on 1 July 2022, when the housing portfolios of the former Transport and Housing Bureau was spun off to form the Housing Bureau. The current (since 1 July 2022) Secretary for Transport and Logistics is Lam Sai-hung.

This bureau was newly established under the re-organization of policy bureaux proposed by Carrie Lam, the fifth Chief Executive of Hong Kong, and was adopted by John Lee, the succeeding Chief Executive after Carrie Lam. On 19 June 2022, the Central People's Government announced the appointment of Lam Sai-hung, former Permanent Secretary for Development (Works), as the first Secretary for Transport and Logistics.

Subordinate departments 
There are several departments under the bureau:
Civil Aviation Department
Highways Department
Marine Department
Transport Department

References

External links

Hong Kong government policy bureaux